Antonio Cortina Farinós (16 February 1841 – 6 November 1890) was a Spanish painter, decorator and art teacher.

Biography
He was born in Almàssera, a town north of Valencia. While he was still just a child, his parents would send him to the streets of Valencia to collect manure for the family farm. As a result, he acquired the nickname "El Femateret" (roughly, the "Little Gardener"), which would follow him throughout his life. While there, he would visit the studios of a local sculptor named Rafael Alemany, where he first displayed a talent for art. Thanks to Alemany, he began to audit classes at the Real Academia de Bellas Artes de San Carlos de Valencia at the age of ten.

He soon attracted the attention of the professors, due to his habit of drawing cartoons in charcoal on streets and walls which, although roundly and properly condemned by the property owners, did display his talent to good effect. His behavior even merited an article in the local newspaper.

In 1856, he received a fellowship of 3,000 Reales that enabled him to study at the Academia full-time until 1862. He became an honorary member of the "" in 1877 and was appointed an assistant professor of line drawing at the Academia in 1884. 

In addition to his painting, he designed rides for a local festival and provided decorations for several cafés in Spain and France. He also produced murals for a number of churches throughout the Valencian Community.

In January 1890, following the death of Professor , Cortina became the Acting Professor of Line Drawing and sought to be permanently appointed to that chair. The official cause of death was given as "cerebral congestion" from a blow to the head. Following the memorial service, several of his artist friends auctioned off a selection of their works to raise money for Cortina's widow and children.

References

Further reading 
 María Ángeles Arazo, “Fantasía en los murales”, Miguel Ángel Catalá Gorgues, “Una peculiar contribución a la iconografía de los ángeles de Antonio Cortina”, Elvira Mas Zurita (Exhibition curator "Redescubriendo al pintor Antonio Cortina 1841-1890'), "Nótulas sobre Antonio Cortina" and "Cortina, un pintor postergado al olvido", and Luis Morote Greus,“Cortina” in Redescubriendo al pintor Antonio Cortina 1841-1890. Exhibition catalog. Valencia: Consorcio de Museos de la Comunitat Valenciana, 2014. 
 Carmen Pinedo Herrero and Elvira Mas Zurita, El profesor que trajo las gallinas a la Escuela. Antonio Cortina Farinós (1841-1890). Valencia: Institució Alfons el Magnànim, 2007. 
 Consuelo Llopis Bauset, Antonio Cortina Farinos: Pintor 1841-1890. self-published, 2004.

External links 

GVA Museo Bellas Artes Valencia 
Las Provincias: "El nieto de Cortina confirma que las pinturas del Ateneo son de su abuelo y no de Sorolla" by Lola Soriano 
 El pintor Antonio Cortina. Vida y obra by Ramón Ribera
 El San Pío V ‘redescubre’ al pintor valenciano Antonio Cortina by Jimmy Entraigües	
CULTURS PLAZA 

1841 births
1890 deaths
Painters from the Valencian Community
Portrait painters
19th-century Spanish painters
Spanish male painters
19th-century Spanish male artists